Khoutsiri is a town in the Kalahari desert of western Botswana.

Populated places in Botswana